The 1964 All-SEC football team consists of American football players selected to the All-Southeastern Conference (SEC) chosen by various selectors for the 1964 NCAA University Division football season.

Offensive selections

Ends
Charles Casey, Florida (AP-1, UPI-2)
Doug Moreau, LSU (AP-1, UPI-2)
Tommy Tolleson, Alabama (AP-2, UPI-3)
Tommy Inman, Miss. St. (AP-2, UPI-3)

Tackles
Jim Wilson, Georgia (AP-1, UPI-1)
Ray Rissmiller, Georgia (AP-2, UPI-1)
George Rice, LSU (AP-1, UPI-3)
Gary Hart, Vanderbilt (AP-2)
Dennis Murphy, Florida (UPI-3)

Guards
Wayne Freeman, Alabama (AP-1, UPI-2)
Larry Gagner, Florida (AP-1)
Remi Prudhomme, LSU (UPI-1)
Stan Hindman, Ole Miss (AP-2, UPI-2)
Justin Canale, Miss. St. (AP-2, UPI-3)

Centers
Richard Granier, LSU (AP-1)
Gaylon McCullough, Alabama (AP-2, UPI-2)
Ruffin Rodrigue, LSU (UPI-3)

Quarterbacks
Joe Namath, Alabama (AP-1, UPI-1)
Steve Spurrier, Florida (College Football Hall of Fame) (UPI-3)

Halfbacks
Rodger Bird, Kentucky (AP-1, UPI-1)
Mike Dennis, Ole Miss (AP-1, UPI-2)
Jim Weatherly, Ole Miss (AP-2, UPI-2)
Marcus Rhoden, Miss. St. (AP-2)
Joe Labrubbo, LSU (UPI-3)
David Ray, Alabama (UPI-3)

Fullbacks
Larry Dupree, Florida (AP-2, UPI-1)
Steve Bowman, Alabama (AP-1, UPI-3)
Hoyle Granger, Miss. St. (AP-2, UPI-2)

Defensive selections

Ends 
Rick Kestner, Kentucky (AP-1, UPI-1 [as E])
Allen Brown, Ole Miss (AP-1, UPI-1 [as E])
Lynn Matthews, Florida (AP-2)
Barry Wilson, Georgia (AP-2)

Tackles 
Dan Kearley, Alabama (AP-1, UPI-2 [as T])
Jack Thornton, Auburn (AP-1)
Tommy Neville, Miss. St. (AP-2, UPI-2 [as T])
George Patton, Georgia (AP-2)

Middle Guards 
Steve DeLong, Tennessee (AP-1, UPI-1 [as G])  
Pat Watson, Miss. St. (AP-2, UPI-1 [as C])
Bill Richbourg, Florida (AP-1, UPI-3 [as G])  
Leon Verriere, Tulane (AP-2)

Linebackers 
Mike Vincent, LSU (AP-1)
Bill Cody, Auburn (AP-1)
Frank Emanuel, Tennessee (AP-2)
Paul Crane, Alabama (AP-2)

Backs 
Tucker Frederickson, Auburn (College Football Hall of Fame) (AP-1, UPI-1 [as HB])
Bruce Bennett, Florida (AP-1)
Wayne Swinford, Georgia (AP-1)
Steve Sloan, Alabama (AP-2, UPI-2 [as QB])
Allen Trammell, Florida (AP-2)
Dave Malone, Vanderbilt (AP-2)

Key

AP = Associated Press

UPI = United Press International

Bold = Consensus first-team selection by both AP and UPI. The AP selection had two platoons, but UPI's did not.

See also
1964 College Football All-America Team

References

All-SEC
All-SEC football teams